John Francis Fitzgerald may refer to:
 John F. Fitzgerald (politician)
 John Fitzgerald (1950s pitcher)
 France Fitzgerald, Irish-born player of American football player